S. M. M. Muszhaaraff ((born 10 June 1983) is a Sri Lankan politician and member of Parliament for Digamadulla District.

Early life
Muszhaaraff was born on 10 June 1983. He is the son of Meeralebbe Safiul Muthunabeen & Meerashahibu Katheeja Beevi.

Career
Muszhaaraff worked as a TV presenter and producer. He has won several State Awards for his shows.

Electoral history

References

External links
 Official Facebook Page of S. M. M. Muszhaaraff MP

1983 births
21st-century Sri Lankan politicians
All Ceylon Makkal Congress politicians
Living people
Members of the 16th Parliament of Sri Lanka
Sri Lankan Moor politicians